The Sardinian regional election of 1994 took place on 12 and 26 June 1994.

The election took place under the provision of a new electoral law, which created a new system under which for the first time ever voters could express an indirect choice for the President through voting the candidate's coalition.

The election was won on the second round by the Progressives' coalition and Federico Palomba (PDS) was elected President of the Region for the 1994–1999 term. Although he didn't manage to win a majority of seats in the Regional Council, he was able to form a government with the external support of centrist and regionalist parties.

New electoral system
As had happened for the March 1994 national election, also in Sardinia a new electoral system was introduced. The proportional representation established after the end of World War II had been abolished and a new majoritarian system based on different pre-electoral coalition was introduced.

For the first time ever Sardinians were asked to choice directly the President of the Region. If no candidates received at least 50% of votes, the top three candidates could go to a second round after two weeks. In this case, the candidate who received more votes would have been elected president.

The election of the Regional Council was based on a direct choice for the candidate with a preference vote. Sixty-four councillors were elected in provincial constituencies by proportional representation using the largest remainder method with a Droop quota and open lists; remained seats and votes were grouped at regional level where a Hare quota was used, and then distributed to provincial party lists. Sixteen councillors were instead elected at-large using a general ticket: parties were required to group in alliances, and the alliance which received a plurality of votes elected some candidates, its leader becoming the President of Sardinia. Also in this case, the number of the seats for each party was determined proportionally.

Results

References

Elections in Sardinia
1994 elections in Italy
June 1994 events in Europe